Michael Ralph Stonebraker (born October 11, 1943) is a computer scientist specializing in database systems. Through a series of academic prototypes and commercial startups, Stonebraker's research and products are central to many relational databases. He is also the founder of many database companies, including Ingres Corporation, Illustra, Paradigm4, StreamBase Systems, Tamr, Vertica and VoltDB, and served as chief technical officer of Informix. For his contributions to database research, Stonebraker received the 2014 Turing Award, often described as "the Nobel Prize for computing."

Stonebraker's career can be broadly divided into two phases: his time at University of California, Berkeley when he focused on relational database management systems such as  Ingres and Postgres, and at Massachusetts Institute of Technology (MIT) where he developed more novel data management techniques such as C-Store, H-Store  and SciDB. Stonebraker is currently a professor emeritus at UC Berkeley and an adjunct professor at MIT's Computer Science and Artificial Intelligence Laboratory. He is also known as an editor for the book Readings in Database Systems.

Life 
Stonebraker grew up in Milton, New Hampshire. He earned his B.S.E. in electrical engineering from Princeton University in 1965, and his M.S. and Ph.D. from the University of Michigan in 1967 and 1971 respectively. His awards include the IEEE John von Neumann Medal and the first SIGMOD Edgar F. Codd Innovations Award. In 1994 he was inducted as a Fellow of the Association for Computing Machinery. In 1997, he was elected a member of the National Academy of Engineering for the development and commercialization of relational and object-relational database systems. In March 2015 it was announced he won the 2014 ACM Turing Award. In September 2015, he won the 2015 Commonwealth Award, chosen by council members of MassTLC.

The Berkeley years (1971–2000) 
Stonebraker joined University of California, Berkeley as an assistant professor in 1971, and taught in the computer science department for twenty-nine years.  It was there that he did his early pioneering work on relational databases.

Ingres 
In 1973, Stonebraker and his colleague Eugene Wong started researching relational database systems after reading a series of seminal papers published by Edgar F. Codd on the relational data model.

Their project,  known as Ingres (Interactive Graphics and Retrieval System), was one of the first systems (along with System R from IBM) to
demonstrate that it was possible to build a practical and efficient implementation of the relational model.  A number of key ideas from INGRES are still widely used in relational systems, including the use of B-trees, primary-copy replication, the query rewrite approach to views and integrity constraints, and the idea of rules/triggers for integrity checking in an RDBMS.  Additionally, much experimental work was done that provided insights into how to build a locking system that could provide satisfactory transaction performance.

By the mid-1970s, Stonebraker's team produced, using a rotating team of student programmers, a usable relational database system. At the time Ingres was considered "low end" compared to IBM's System R, as it ran on Unix-based Digital Equipment Corporation machines as opposed to the "big iron" IBM mainframes.

By the early 1980s, however, the performance and capabilities of these low-end machines were seriously threatening IBM's mainframe market, and with the threat came the ability of Ingres to become a viable, "real" product for a large number of applications. Ingres used a variation of the BSD license for a nominal fee, and soon a number of companies took advantage of this to create commercial versions of Ingres .

These included Stonebraker, who with fellow Berkeley professors Larry Rowe and Eugene Wong helped found Relational Technology, Inc., later called Ingres Corporation. Subsequently, sold to Computer Associates, Ingres was re-established as an independent company in 2005, and later renamed Actian.  Other startups based on Ingres include Sybase, founded by Robert Epstein, a student on the project, and Britton Lee, Inc. Sybase's code was later used as a basis for Microsoft SQL Server.

Postgres 
After founding Relational Technology, Stonebraker and Rowe began a "post-Ingres" effort, to address the limitations of the relational model. The new project was named POSTGRES (POST inGRES), and was designed to add support for complex data types to database systems and improve end-to-end performance of data-intensive applications. Postgres provided an object relational programming model in which fields could be complex datatypes, and where users could register new types as well as scalar and aggregate functions over those types. POSTGRES was extensible in a number of other ways, making it easy for programmers to modify or add to the optimizer, query language, runtime, and indexing frameworks. These features improved both database programmability and performance, and made it possible to push large portions of a number of applications inside the database, including geographic information systems and time series processing.  This had the effect of substantially broadening the commercial database market.

POSTGRES was also offered using a BSD-like license, and the code forms the basis of today's free software, PostgreSQL. Stonebraker also led an effort to commercialize the code, creating Illustra which was purchased by Informix. PostgreSQL has been used as the basis for a number of other startup companies, including Aster Data Systems, EnterpriseDB, and Greenplum.

Informix acquired Illustra in 1996, and Stonebraker became Informix's CTO, a position he held until September 2000. Informix integrated Illustra's O–R mapping and DataBlades into the 7.x OnLine product, resulting in Informix Universal Server (IUS), or more generally, Version 9.

Mariposa and Cohera 
After the Postgres project, Stonebraker initiated the Mariposa project which became the basis of Cohera Corporation.  Mariposa built a federated database over an economic model of resource trading, in which data distributed across multiple organizations could be integrated and queried from a single relational interface, governed by site-specific policies that would charge for data processing and storage.  These economic policies allowed traditional ideas in query optimization to be carried out over competing sites, and also served as the basis for data storage, replication and movement within a federation.

Cohera's initial mission was to commercialize Mariposa, but eventually focused on a business-to-business catalog management application on the core federated data integration engine. Cohera's intellectual property was purchased by PeopleSoft in 2001,
and used as the basis of PeopleSoft's Enterprise Catalog Management.  PeopleSoft was in turn purchased by Oracle Corporation in 2004.

The MIT years (2001–present) 
Stonebraker became an adjunct professor at MIT in 2001, where he began another series of research projects and founded a number of companies.

Aurora and StreamBase 
In the Aurora Project, Stonebraker, along with colleagues from Brandeis University, Brown University, and MIT, focused on data management for streaming data, using a new data model and query language.  Unlike relational systems, which "pull" data and process it a record at a time, in Aurora, data is "pushed", arriving asynchronously from external data sources (such as stock ticks, news feeds, or sensors.)  The output is itself a stream of results (such as windowed averages) that are sent to users.

Stonebraker co-founded StreamBase Systems in 2003 to commercialize the technology behind Aurora.

C-Store and Vertica 
In the C-Store project, started in 2005, Stonebraker, along with colleagues from Brandeis, Brown, MIT, and University of Massachusetts Boston, developed a parallel, shared-nothing column-oriented DBMS for data warehousing.  By dividing and storing data in columns, C-Store is able to perform less I/O and get better compression ratios than conventional database systems that store data in rows.

Stonebraker explained that it's because similar data items are side-by-side: Name,Name,Name,Name  vs. Name,Address,Zip,Phone#. In 2005, Stonebraker co-founded Vertica to commercialize the technology behind C-Store.

Morpheus and Goby 
In 2006, Stonebraker started the Morpheus project, along with researchers from the University of Florida.  Morpheus is a data integration system which relies on a collection of "transforms" to mediate between data sources.  Each transform provides a queryable interface to particular web site or service, and Morpheus makes it possible to search for and compose multiple transforms to provide a new service or a unified view of several services.

In 2009, Stonebraker co-founded Goby, a local search company based on ideas from Morpheus, for people to explore new things to do in free time.

H-Store and VoltDB 
In 2007, with researchers from Brown University, MIT, and Yale University, Stonebraker started the H-Store project. H-Store is a distributed main-memory online transaction processing (OLTP) system designed to provide very high throughput on transaction processing workloads.

In 2009, Stonebraker co-founded, and then served as an adviser to, VoltDB a commercial startup based on ideas from the H-Store project.

SciDB 
In 2008, along with David DeWitt and researchers from Brown, MIT, Portland State University, SLAC, the University of Washington, and the University of Wisconsin–Madison, Stonebraker started SciDB an open-source DBMS specially designed for scientific research applications.

He founded Paradigm4  with Marilyn Matz, who became CEO. Paradigm4 developed SciDB, used mostly by life sciences and financial markets. Novartis, Foundation Medicine, and the National Institutes of Health are some of the company's clients.

NoSQL 
In 2010 and 2011, Stonebraker criticized the NoSQL movement.

Notable students 

Stonebraker trained more than 30 students, including:
 Andy Pavlo, A Databases Legend
 Daniel Abadi, co-founder of Hadapt (acquired by Teradata)
 Michael J. Carey, professor at UC Irvine
 Paula Hawthorn, co-founder of Britton Lee
 Marti Hearst, professor at UC Berkeley
 Joseph M. Hellerstein, professor at UC Berkeley
 Clifford A. Lynch, executive director of the Coalition for Networked Information
 Margo Seltzer, professor at the University of British Columbia, founder and former CTO of Sleepycat Software
 Dale Skeen, founder of Tibco, founder and CEO of Vitria

Selected works

References

External links 

, a series of recent interviews and comments about and by Stonebraker.

, a new search engine to find fun things to do in one's free time (co-founded by Stonebraker)

American computer scientists
Database researchers
American computer businesspeople
Princeton University alumni
University of Michigan alumni
Fellows of the Association for Computing Machinery
Foreign Members of the Russian Academy of Sciences
Living people
1943 births
Informix
Turing Award laureates
People from Newburyport, Massachusetts
People from Milton, New Hampshire
UC Berkeley College of Engineering faculty